Firuzeh (also Romanized as Fīrūzeh; formerly, Bozghan , also Romanized as Bozghān and Barghān) is a city and capital of Firuzeh County, in Razavi Khorasan Province, Iran. At the 2006 census, its population was 4,906, in 1,288 families.  Firuzeh means "turquoise" in Persian. This city and the city of Bar used to be part of the county of Nishapur though now they have become part of a separated county. These cities are historically part of the Greater Region of the city of Nishapur and its people have daily commute and connections with each other.

References 

Populated places in Firuzeh County
Cities in Razavi Khorasan Province